San Calogero is a comune (municipality) in the Province of Vibo Valentia in the Italian region Calabria, located about  southwest of Catanzaro and about  southwest of Vibo Valentia.

San Calogero borders the following municipalities: Candidoni, Filandari, Limbadi, Mileto, Rombiolo.

Demographic evolution

References

Cities and towns in Calabria